John Zinser may refer to:
 John Zinser (American football)
 John Zinser (game designer)